Miaoli is a railway station in Miaoli County, Taiwan served by Taiwan High Speed Rail. Transfers to Fengfu railway station can be made at this station, which links to Miaoli railway station located in Miaoli City.

Overview
Due to funding problems, Miaoli Station was not constructed when Taiwan High Speed Rail first opened for service in 2007, and the detailed design began in 2010. Construction began on 28 January 2013, and the station opened on 1 December 2015. The station consists of one elevated main station and two side platforms. Availability of high speed rail reduced travel time between Miaoli County and Taipei City to 43-49 minutes.

To allow transfers to TRA, Fengfu railway station was moved approx. 400 meters north of its original location on September 10, 2016 to connect with the HSR station.

Station layout

HSR services
The station is only served by trains which stop at all stations. It is normally served by 8xx trains which stop at all stations on the Taiwan High Speed Rail, and occasionally served by (1)5xx trains which depart/terminate at Taichung HSR station.

Around the station
 Hakka Round House
 Yingtsai Academy
 TRA Fengfu Station

See also
 List of railway stations in Taiwan

References

Railway stations served by Taiwan High Speed Rail
Railway stations in Miaoli County
2015 establishments in Taiwan